Below is a list of Cage Rage champions at each weight class.

World Championship

Heavyweight Championship
Weight limit: Unlimited

Light Heavyweight Championship
Weight limit:

Middleweight Championship
Weight limit:

Welterweight Championship
Weight limit:

Lightweight Championship
Weight limit:

Featherweight Championship
Weight limit:

British Championship (Symbolic title)

Heavyweight Championship
Weight limit: Unlimited

Light Heavyweight Championship
Weight limit:

Middleweight Championship
Weight limit:

Welterweight Championship
Weight limit:

Lightweight Championship
Weight limit:

Featherweight Championship
Weight limit:

See also 
List of PRIDE champions
List of UFC champions

References

Mixed martial arts champions
Cage Rage Champions, List Of